John Textor (born September 30, 1965) is an American businessman. He is the former Executive Chairman of fuboTV, Inc. (following its merger with Textor's Facebank Group, Inc.), a sports-centric OTT streaming company. Textor is a globally recognized entrepreneur of digital distribution business models for media & entertainment. He has been recognized for his work in the fields of digital media & entertainment with the nickname "Hollywood's Virtual Reality Guru".

Textor is the majority shareholder of Botafogo de Futebol e Regatas, a historic football club in Brazil which is based in Rio de Janeiro. Botafogo competes in the Campeonato Brasileiro Série A, the highest level of Brazil's football system. Textor is also a co-owner of Crystal Palace Football Club, based in  London, which currently competes in the Premier League, the highest level of English football. Textor also holds a majority stake in Belgian First Division B side RWD Molenbeek. Textor is also the majority shareholder of the French football club Olympique Lyonnais, which competes in France’s highest football level, Ligue 1.

Early life 
John Textor was born as a member of the extended du Pont family in 1965. Textor claims to have grown up in a middle-class family in the Palm Beach area in Florida whilst spending his summers working for freight delivery companies. Textor competed in freestyle skateboarding competitions around Florida as part of the Sims Skateboards team. According to Craig Snyder's A Secret History of the Ollie, [page 464 ] Textor was said to have been "one of the few who surpassed [multiple world champion] Rodney Mullen in freestyle competition during" the late 1970s". Textor left competitive skateboarding in the early 1980s to focus on other interests after sustaining a severe head injury in competition. Textor claimed this accident was the reason he turned toward his education and to technology interests at a young age.

Business career

Football
In August 2021, Textor invested £86million for 40% ownership in Crystal Palace Football Club, joining Steve Parish, Josh Harris, and David Blitzer as a co-owner. Textor was also linked to efforts to purchase Brentford FC, Watford FC and Newcastle United.

In January 2022, Textor signed a binding offer to purchase 90% ownership in Botafogo de Futebol e Regatas. According to the Belgian press, Textor acquired 80% of RWD Molenbeek in the same week. 

On June 20, 2022, Textor became the owner of Olympique Lyonnais by acquiring 40% of the OL Group shares, held by IDG Capital and Pathé, and the majority of shares previously held by Jean-Michel Aulas.
On December 19, 2022, The Financial Times reported that Textor had acquired a 77.49% stake in the club through his investment vehicle, Eagle Football Holdings. The reported total value of the deal is $940 million (€884mn).

Technology, Media and Entertainment

fuboTV (Facebank Group)

According to a 2019 SEC filing Facebank Group previously operated as Pulse Evolution Group and Recall Studios. The organization’s filing described them as a digital human technology company, focused on the development, collection, protection and preparation of the personal digital likeness assets, of celebrities and consumers, for use in artificial intelligence, entertainment, personal productivity and social networking. When it acquired Fubo TV. Allywatch described the acquisition as a reverse merger that effectively enabled Fubo TV to operate as a public company. Fubo claimed that the merger expanded the organization's presence in the over-the-top television industry

In April 2020, Textor completed the acquisition of fuboTV Media. via zoom call. Thusly, Fubo went public. and in under two years, grew to an NYSE-listed market value of more than $6 billion.

In the spring of 2020, Textor resigned from his post as Executive Chairman of fuboTV. At the time of his resignation from fuboTV, and through completion of the company's IPO on the New York Stock Exchange, Textor remained the largest shareholder of fuboTV.

FuboTV grew rapidly in value as a public company, moving from the over-the-counter market, to the New York Stock Exchange, to the Russell 3000 index in only 9 months.

Digital Domain

In May 2006, Textor as one of the principals of Wyncrest Holdings, acquired Digital Domain. Other principals included film director Michael Bay and former NFL player, Dan Marino. According to Variety magazine an inside source claimed that the buyers purchased the company for an estimated $35 million.

Digital Domain won an Academy Award in 2009 for Achievement in Visual Effects for creating a believable digital human actor in The Curious Case of Benjamin Button. This achievement, known as the ‘Holy Grail of "Visual Effects" by The Hollywood Reporter.

In 2011, Digital Domain Media Group entered into the film production business with a major investment into the feature film Ender's Game. Textor is credited as Producer and Executive Producer on the film.

Textor's team of around 20 artists organized the 2012 appearance of Virtual Tupac Shakur at the Coachella Valley Music Festival. The performance  earned Textor's studio the Titanium Award at the 59th annual Cannes Lions International Festival of Creativity.

Digital Domain went bankrupt in 2012 and a short time later, Textor was sued by the state of Florida for $80M.

The Supreme Court of New York and the Inspector General of the State of Florida cleared Textor of any financial wrongdoing, and The Athletic reported that he had received a settlement from the hedge fund that caused the collapse. The settlement awarded Textor $8.5 million in financial damages and assigned all technology assets of Digital Domain’s Florida studio.

SEC filings demonstrate that Textor used the award of these technology assets to launch the business that would ultimately become fuboTV. Textor went on to launch Facebank in 2013. “a technology-driven intellectual property company engaged in the development and promotion of human likeness technologies”, and, in 2020, he bought sports streaming platform fuboTV, merging the two businesses before floating them on the New York Stock Exchange as FuboTV Inc.

Pulse Evolution
In late 2013, Textor organized a group of former Digital Domain employees to create Pulse Evolution Corporation. Pulse Evolution Corporation is a globally recognized pioneer in the development of hyper-realistic digital humans for live shows, virtual reality, augmented reality, holographic, 3D stereoscopic, web, mobile, interactive and artificial intelligence applications. Pulse Evolution showcased its technology with a holographic performance of Virtual Michael Jackson at the 2014 Billboard Music Awards

Internet Businesses

Art Technology Group 
Textor’s holding company, Wyndcrest Partners, funded the struggling company in 1996. Wyndcrest guided ATG through an IPO in 1999 resulting in a liquid valuation of $10 billion.

Virtual Bank/Lydian Trust Company 
Textor was a founding director of Virtual Bank, an Internet banking startup. Virtual Bank was a multi-billion dollar diversified financial services company and included a private wealth business known as Lydian Trust Company.

JesterDigital
According to The Palm Beach Post, Textor’s Jester Digital created an internet-based 3-D multi-user virtual world, referred to as the "metaverse". Jester Digital’s new technology was the first digital distribution platform to be endorsed by Metallica and was also supported by joint-ventures with leading digital rights management companies, such as IBM, and strategic relationships with leading music artists and action sports companies. Jester Digital Corporation was among the earliest to create internet-based multi-user virtual reality and game-like environments which paved the way for the convergence of music and the internet, massive multi-player games, and the digital distribution of entertainment content.

BabyUniverse
In the early 2000s, Textor took control of BabyUniverse, a struggling online retailer. He took the company public in 2005 selling 2 million shares of common stock, equivalent to approximately $16.5 million. Using proceeds from the IPO, Textor purchased other online retailers and a marketing company to help build the brand. BabyUniverse saw an increase in revenues from $1 million to $40 million, resulting in the October 2007 sale of BabyUniverse into a reverse merger and change of control transaction with eToys.com, a well-known e-commerce company, controlled by D.E. Shaw. Textor resigned as CEO at the time of the merger, with BabyUniverse stock trading at its all-time high of $12.00 per share, having nearly tripled from its low in February of that same year. He later became Chairman of eToys.

Action Sports

Sims Snowboards 
Having acquired Sims Snowboards in 1996, Textor served as Chairman of the Board and the principal owner. During his tenure, and utilizing the trademarks owned by his partner and snowboard pioneer Tom Sims, he created the World Snowboarding Championship at Whistler, British Columbia.

References

Further reading 
 Snyder, Craig. A Secret History of the Ollie, 2005. 

1965 births
People from Missouri
Living people
American mass media owners
American music industry executives
American film producers
Psi Upsilon
American soccer chairmen and investors
Chairmen and investors of football clubs in England
Chairmen and investors of football clubs in France